

Description 
Megaporus can be distinguished as sub-cylindrical with a body that narrows towards the abdominal apex. With a pear shaped head that tapers posteriorly but not constricted at the occipital level suture.

Megaporus is a genus of beetles in the family Dytiscidae, containing the following species:

 Megaporus fischeri Mouchamps, 1964
 Megaporus gardnerii (Clark, 1862)
 Megaporus hamatus (Clark, 1862)
 Megaporus howittii (Clark, 1862)
 Megaporus natvigi Mouchamps, 1964
 Megaporus piceatus (Régimbart, 1892)
 Megaporus ruficeps (Sharp, 1882)
 Megaporus solidus (Sharp, 1882)
 Megaporus tristis (Zimmermann, 1926)
 Megaporus wilsoni Mouchamps, 1964

References

Dytiscidae genera